Jim Roach (born October 28, 1977) is an American multi-instrumentalist producer, songwriter, and owner of Red Parade Music Group, an indie record company based in Los Angeles, California.

Life and career
Roach was born in Southern California, grew up in San Diego, and graduated from Westmont College in Santa Barbara, California with a Bachelor of Arts in Rhetoric and Communication Studies. While in college, he was heavily involved with music (despite dropping his music minor) and was in and out of several bands – most notably the Southern California punk rock group Tasty Snax, where he met and became bandmates with Dave "Phoenix" Farrell, who is now the bass player for the well-known multi-platinum band Linkin Park.

In 2002, after Tasty Snax disbanded, Roach was approached (by two of his classmates, Benjamin Holsteen and Eric Palmquist) to play guitar on a demo for their new band called The Rosewood Fall. The Rosewood Fall recorded their demo in late 2002 and in 2003, the band signed with Linkin Park's own label Machine Shop Recordings. In May of 2004, they released their Demonstrate EP.

After being dropped from the label, Roach took a job as the touring drummer and music director for gold selling Geffen artist Hoku. Her success was widely recognized after her hit single "Perfect Day" made it in the feature film Legally Blonde. After years of touring with Hoku, he went on to produce her second album Listen Up.

In 2005, Roach was drafted by EMI/Re:Think Records to play lead guitar on the road and in the studio with the band This World Fair out of Minneapolis. He stayed with the band for a stint of touring and for the making of their album at  Sonic Ranch Studios in Texas.

After several years of being on the road and in the studio as a drummer, bass player, guitar player, and songwriter for these major label groups, Roach resigned from his role as a working musician. In the fall of 2005, he shifted his attention to work exclusively in the studio with artists that were looking to hone their sound and songs.

Having the unique experience of having spent years on the other side of the glass as a musician, Roach uses his ability to relate to what the artist is going through while recording towards his approach to making records.

In recent years, Roach's musical repertoire has also expanded to include film and television placement, having penned, produced, and mixed the end credit songs in films such as Golden Globe nominated Salmon Fishing in the Yemen, Tyler Perry's upcoming film Temptation: Confessions of a Marriage Counselor, and The Darkest Hour, starring Emile Hirsch; as well as multiple songs in films like The Internship starring Owen Wilson and Vince Vaughn, Disney’s PROM and TV shows on ABC, FOX, and CBS.

In 2012, Roach formed a joint-venture publishing company called Kung Fu Culture Publishing with music supervisor Dave Jordan and his company, Format Entertainment. Jordan and his team of supervisors have handled the music for films like the Iron Man trilogy, Transformers, The Bourne Identity, Captain America, Alvin and the Chipmunks, The Devil Wears Prada,  both Sex and the City films, Arthur, and many more. In television Jim has written songs for shows like Jane by Design (ABC Family), Drop Dead Diva (Lifetime), Level Up (U.S. TV series) (Cartoon Network), Breaking In (TV series) (FOX), as well as several placements on VH1 and MTV.

As the owner of indie label Red Parade Music, Roach has discovered and developed the careers of artists like Jesse Thomas, The Young Romans, Go Tell The Eskimo, Skyler Stonestreet, and Javier Dunn - artists that have gone from the unknown to charting on Billboard charts with their first release. Rooted in the long lost approach of taking time to develop and nurture great artistry over time, Red Parade gives its artists long leashes to find who they are both in and out of the studio, relieving them of the pressures of studio time limits, and the understanding with the artists is that a record takes as long as it takes to be done right.

In 2015 he and comedian Kyle Dunnigan won an Emmy in the category of Outstanding Music & Lyrics for writing "Girl You Don't Need Makeup" which was written for comedian Amy Schumer and her show "Inside Amy Schumer."

Aside from writing and producing Jim is an executive producer for Apple Music / Beats1 where he developed shows for St. Vincent, Josh Homme of Queens Of The Stone Age, Haim, Ezra Koenig of Vampire Weekend, Corey Taylor of Slipknot and Chilly Gonzales.

Roach is the primary producer for the comedy bands Ninja Sex Party and Starbomb; and in 2022, he released a single alongside Dan Avidan who's from both those bands, as their new rock duo Shadow Academy. Their self-titled debut album was released the same year.

Discography

References

Record producers from California
American multi-instrumentalists
Living people
1977 births